Bacon and God's Wrath is a Canadian short documentary film, which premiered at the 2015 Toronto International Film Festival. Directed by Sol Friedman and mixing animation with live action interview footage, the film centres on Razie Brownstone, a 90-year-old Jewish woman who, after undergoing a crisis of faith which has led her to reject many of the tenets of her religion, is preparing to cook and eat bacon for the first time in her life.

At TIFF, the film received an Honourable Mention from the jury for the Best Canadian Short Film award. The film was later named to TIFF's year-end Canada's Top Ten list of the best Canadian short films of the year.

In 2016 the film won the Short Film Jury Award for Non-fiction at the 2016 Sundance Film Festival, and the Canadian Screen Award for Best Short Documentary at the 4th Canadian Screen Awards.

References

External links 
 
 Bacon and God's Wrath at The New Yorker

2015 short documentary films
Canadian short documentary films
Canadian animated short films
Canadian animated documentary films
Best Short Documentary Film Genie and Canadian Screen Award winners
Jewish Canadian films
Documentary films about Jews and Judaism
2010s English-language films
2010s Canadian films